Matthew Cordell is an American author and illustrator of children's books. His book Wolf in the Snow won the 2018 Caldecott Medal.

Author-Illustrator Bibliography 

 Trouble Gum (Feiwel & Friends, 2009)
 Another Brother (Feiwel & Friends, 2012)
 hello! hello! (Little, Brown Books for Young Readers, 2012)
 Wish (Disney-Hyperion, 2015)
 Wolf in the Snow (Feiwel & Friends, 2017)
 Dream (Little, Brown Books for Young Readers, 2017)
 King Alice (Feiwel & Friends, 2018)
 Hope (Disney-Hyperion, 2019)
 Explorers (Feiwel & Friends, 2019)
 Hello, Neighbor!: The Kind and Caring World of Mister Rogers (Neal Porter Books, 2020)
 Bear Island (Feiwel & Friends, 2021)

References

Artists from South Carolina
Caldecott Medal winners
Living people
Writers from Greenville, South Carolina
Year of birth missing (living people)